Eleventeen was the debut album by UK alternative rock band Daisy Chainsaw, and their only album with Katie Jane Garside as lead vocalist. It peaked the UK Albums Chart at #62.
Three songs from the album were released as singles. 'Love Your Money' was the biggest hit, reaching #26 in the UK Singles Chart, while follow-up 'Pink Flower' was a UK #65. In 2014 Buzzsaw Records announced a double CD special edition of Eleventeen, which is available on daisychainsaw.net.

Track listing

References 

1992 debut albums
Daisy Chainsaw albums
One Little Independent Records albums
Albums produced by Ken Thomas (record producer)